Sorochy Log is a rural locality (a selo) and the administrative center of Sorochelogovskoy Selsoviet, Pervomaysky District, Altai Krai, Russia. The population was 1,195 as of 2013. There are 11 streets.

Geography 
Sorochy Log is located 28 km northwest of Novoaltaysk (the district's administrative centre) by road. Beshentsevo is the nearest rural locality.

References 

Rural localities in Pervomaysky District, Altai Krai